Maarouf al-Dawalibi (29 March 1909 – 15 August 2004), was a Syrian politician and was twice the prime minister of Syria. He was born in Aleppo, and held a Ph.D. in Law. He served as a minister of economy between 1949 and 1950, and was elected speaker of the parliament in 1951. He also served as minister of defense in 1954. After the Ba'ath party came to power in 1963, he was imprisoned and later exiled, serving as an adviser to several Saudi kings, including King Khalid. His son, Nofal al-Dawalibi, is involved in the Syrian Opposition.

Biography
Maarouf al-Dawalibi was born in Aleppo. He received his early education in Aleppo and graduated from the University of Damascus with a B.A. in Law. He did his doctoral studies at the Sorbonne University on the Roman Law.

al-Dawalibi became a professor at the University of Damacus and authored al-Huqūq al-Rūmāniyah, which was later published by the university. When the university set up Faculty of the Shariah, he was appointed to teach the principles of Fiqh. He authored Madkhal ilā ʻilm uṣūl al-fiqh, a book that is taught in the seminaries affiliated with the Nadwatul Ulama.

References

1909 births
2004 deaths
Prime Ministers of Syria
Foreign ministers of Syria
Speakers of the People's Assembly of Syria
Syrian ministers of economy
Syrian ministers of defense
National Bloc (Syria) politicians
People's Party (Syria) politicians
20th-century Syrian politicians
People from Aleppo